Llanteno is a village and council located in the municipality of Aiara, in Álava province, Basque Country, Spain. As of 2020, it has a population of 101.

Geography 
Llanteno is located 54km northwest of Vitoria-Gasteiz.

References

Populated places in Álava